Women Who Love Too Much is a self-help book by licensed marriage and family therapist Robin Norwood published in 1985. 

The book, which was a number one seller on the New York Times Best Seller list's "advice and miscellaneous" category in 1987, is credited with "spawn[ing] a cottage industry in the therapy community." Its premise, that women who get "mired in obsessive relationships" are to help themselves, was criticized by some feminist scholars.

See also
Codependence

References

1985 non-fiction books
Self-help books
Popular psychology
Gender studies books